Vadim Arsenyevich Yefremovich (or Efremovich) (16 October 1903 – 1 May  1989) was a Soviet mathematician.

Yefremovich was a member of the Moscow Topological School, and specialized in the geometric aspects of general topology.  He introduced the notion of proximity spaces at the First International Topological Conference in Moscow in 1935.  He was imprisoned from 1937 to 1944, and did not publish on proximity spaces until 1951, at which point the theory was developed rapidly by Efremovič and associates.

Yefremovich also introduced the notion of "volume invariants" for "equimorphisms" (that is, uniformly bicontinuous) on metric spaces. These have proven to be very important in the study of manifolds and hyperbolic geometry.

References

Bibliography 
Vadim Arsenyevich Yefremovich (obituary), in Russian Mathematical Surveys 45:6 (1990), pp 137–138.

1903 births
1989 deaths
20th-century Russian mathematicians